Avengers Mansion is a fictional building appearing in American comic books published by Marvel Comics. It has traditionally been the base of the Avengers. The enormous, city block-sized building is located at 890 Fifth Avenue, Manhattan, New York City.

Creative origin
Avengers Mansion's address is 890 Fifth Avenue in the borough of Manhattan in New York City. According to Stan Lee, who co-created the Avengers:

Lee later recounted, "I can't tell you how many fan letters I would receive from kids saying, 'We came to New York and we were looking for the Stark mansion and couldn't find it. What address is it?' [laughs] So that made me feel good. I felt we had accomplished our objective. We had made it seem realistic." In real life, 890 Fifth Avenue is 1 East 70th Street, the location of the Henry Clay Frick House, which houses the Frick Collection. The building is, like Avengers Mansion, a city block-sized mansion.

Fictional history and layout
When occupied, the mansion was originally the Stark family manor, until their only son, Tony Stark, inherited their fortune and soon took on the guise of Iron Man. He donated the mansion to the Avengers and had it financed through the charitable Maria Stark Foundation. It was primarily looked after by the Stark family butler, Edwin Jarvis, who not only took care of the mansion but also catered to the needs of the Avengers team. It served as a place to plan and strategize and a home for Avengers members when they needed it.

It had three above-ground floors and three basement floors. The first three floors were open to the public and had twelve rooms to house Avengers who wished to reside in the mansion, as well as Jarvis's quarters. A portion of the mansion's third floor served as a hangar for the Avengers' quinjets, their primary mode of transportation.

The three floors below ground were restricted from the public and had modified rooms for the Avengers' needs. Such rooms below ground were: Howard Stark's "Arsenal" chamber, the Avengers gym, Hawkeye's test-shooting room, the training room (much like the X-Mansion's Danger Room), the cryogenic storage area, a vault to contain Jack of Hearts's power, and the ultra-secure assembly room.

The Fantastic Four took up temporary residence at Avengers Mansion after their headquarters (the original Baxter Building) was destroyed.

The mansion has been destroyed twice. The first time was in Avengers: Under Siege when a huge grouping of Masters of Evil, led by Baron Helmut Zemo, attacked the Avengers and destroyed the Mansion and beat Hercules into a coma among other things before being repulsed.

In the immediate aftermath, the Avengers would relocate to a floating platform called Hydro-Base, while the former Mansion site became known as "Avengers Park", and was unused. Hydro-Base was later destroyed as well.

The Mansion would be featured in a Damage Control story. The reconstruction firm was hired to refit and rebuild the mansion, a task they accomplished easily. Unfortunately they did not manage to move it as easily and it fell into one of New York's rivers.

Later, the Avengers built a new headquarters on the site of the Mansion and resided there until it was destroyed by the Gatherers, a team of alternate universe Avengers. Ute, a Watcher enslaved by the villain Proctor, brought an alternate reality version of the original Avengers Mansion to the site as a dying gift.

This replacement Mansion would survive various assaults until, in the "Avengers Disassembled" storyline, the Scarlet Witch was responsible for its destruction by bringing an undead version of Jack of Hearts that exploded, also killing Scott Lang, the second Ant-Man, and in Avengers Finale (January 2005), Stark decided that with his dwindling assets, he could no longer afford to maintain the building and it was abandoned in its derelict state, left as a memorial to the Avengers who had died. Stark, using his considerable political and social influence, had the grounds declared a landmark by the city of New York. Since then, the Young Avengers have restored much of the statuary on the grounds of the mansion. The Avengers have relocated to Stark Tower, although it is unknown how permanent this move will be, especially in light of the events of Marvel's Civil War storyline, which causes the virtual splitting of the New Avengers down the line between those who were pro-registration and those who were against it.

Even after its destruction, the mansion remains a hub of superhuman activity. The Young Avengers were attacked by, and later defeated, Kang the Conqueror there. They later restored the many statues in the mansion's grounds, adopting the mansion as their meeting place.

During the highest tensions of the Civil War incident, Iron Man and Captain America meet at the ruins in order to talk things out. They tour the grounds and even find abandoned framed photographs of old allies.

Former Avenger Clint Barton has made his way on to the grounds several times since then, most recently following Captain America's death. He meets with Tony Stark to discuss the implications of Steve Rogers' assassination.

After the Skrull invasion, S.H.I.E.L.D.'s replacement agency H.A.M.M.E.R. kept an eye on the mansion in case the Young Avengers, still wanted for refusing to be registered, showed up. The young group did anyway, using the building as a central point for many meetings.

Following the Siege of Asgard and at the start of the Heroic Age, Steve Rogers and Tony Stark sold the mansion to Luke Cage for a dollar allowing him freedom to recruit his own Avengers team and operate from the mansion while the other Avengers team operate from the Infinite Avengers Mansion and Avengers Tower. After an extended period, and severe damage thanks to Daniel Drumm the New Avengers dissolve, and Cage sells the mansion back to Stark for five dollars.

After yet another roster reshuffling, the mansion was refitted as the headquarters for the new Avengers Unity Squad which is funded by Janet Van Dyne. A computerized A.I. system called J.A.R.V.I.S. is installed to replace Edwin Jarvis (who still lives in Avengers Tower with the main team).

Following the reconstruction of the multiverse, the mansion officially became a theme hotel as the Avengers teams move on to other bases, but they were unaware that the Red Skull and Sin are hiding in a secure room under the mansion, carrying out an unspecified plan. After this, the mansion was purchased by Unity Squad member Johnny Storm with the money he had inherited from his apparently dead brother-in-law's patents, who created Avengers Mansion Inc. to run the property on behalf of the Avengers.

Surrounding grounds
The Mansion was surrounded by a wall twelve feet high and one foot thick, as well as an array of high-tech security defenses. A main feature of the defenses were large, restrictive coils. These were sometimes backed up by energy beams that shot out from the ground. Nonetheless, those defenses were often breached by the supervillains faced by the Avengers. Shortly after the Avengers moved into the Mansion, Iron Man and Thor moved the Mansion 35 feet away from the street, increasing the size of the front lawn and giving the Avengers more privacy.

When Tony Stark was the United States' Secretary of Defense, the mansion's security systems were backed up by government forces.

The mansion's grounds featured an array of statues of past and present Avengers, constructed out of adamantium. The statues were destroyed in a battle with the Asgardian god, Loki. One of the trees on the grounds used to hold a miniature lab belonging to Hank Pym. The statues return around the time the 'New Avengers' leave the mansion.

Avengers support crew
 Antony "Rider" Ovens - Member of the Teen Brigade.
 Arnold "Arnie" Roth - A publicist, deceased (cancer)
 William "Bill" Foster (Giant-Man) - A biochemist and Avengers Compound contractor. He is killed by Ragnarok in Civil War #4.
 Robert "Bob" Frank Jr. (Nuklo) - The Custodian and Groundskeeper of Avengers Mansion.
 Buddy Sampson - Member of the Teen Brigade.
 Carlos Alvarez - The Avengers Compound pool man, Deceased.
 Charles "Charlie" Wallace - Member of the Teen Brigade.
 Consuela Sanchez - The Avengers Compound housekeeper and nanny to Rachel Carpenter. 
 Daniella Tomaz - The Avengers Compound Nurse.
 David Cannon - He used the identity "Charles Matthews" who was Janet van Dyne's chauffeur. He is later fired when his true identity is revealed.
 Devi Bannerjee - The U.N. liaison to the Avengers.
 Diane Arliss Newell - The Avengers Compound Secretary. Wife of Walter and sister of Todd Arliss.
 Donna Maria Puentes - An administrator who would later become a receptionist.
 Duane Jerome Freeman - A federal security liaison to the Avengers. Duane is also a member of the Triune Understanding. He was killed during Kang the Conqueror's destruction of Washington.
 Edwin Jarvis - Butler and chief of staff. He was the former butler of the Stark Family. He was replaced by a Skrull during the Secret Invasion.
 Elsa Hunter - Governess to Thomas and William Maximoff.
 Emerson Bale - A lawyer.
 Emma Hegyes - The Avengers Compound Cook.
 Fabian Stankowicz - Machinesmith, later known as the Mechanaut. He creates robotic Avengers after the Onslaught battle but is defeated by Jarvis.
 Florence "Candy" Stephens - Member of the Teen Brigade.
 Francis Barnum - A construction worker.
 Franz Anton - A one-time biochemical consultant. 
 Gary Tomasi - A kitchen staff member.
 Genji Odashu - A pilot and formerly the operator of the Shogun Warrior Combatra.
 Gilbert Vaughn - A physicist. He is currently deceased.
 Major Gordon Kenneth Carlson - A one-time physician.
 Grant "Specs" McIntosh - Member of the Teen Brigade.
 Hector Sandrose - Avengers Compound communications chief.
 Helen Bach - The nanny to Thomas and William Maximoff.
 Henry Peter Gyrich - National Security Council liaison. He worked at Camp Hammond.
 Hank Pym - Avengers Compound majordomo and biochemist.
 Dr. Hjarmal Knute Svenson - A one-time surgeon.
 Ian Burch - An accountant.
 Inger Sullivan - A lawyer.
 Jack Bale - A construction foreman.
 James Campbell - A European monitor station caretaker, deceased.
 James Murch - A federal security liaison.
 Jane Foster - A team physician.
 Janice Imperato - Maria Stark Foundation accountant. 
 Jeryn Hogarth - A lawyer.
 Joachin Mendez - Avengers Compound chief groundskeeper.
 John Jameson - A pilot. He was once married to Jennifer Walters
 Jorge Latham - Avengers Compound mechanic.
 Juan Mercado - Avengers Compound communications member.
 K.C. Ritter (Sam Casey) - Member of the Teen Brigade. 
 Keith Kincaid - A physician. He is married to Jane Foster.
 Lauren Timm - Governess to William and Thomas Maximoff.
 M’Daka - A mechanic.
 Marilla - Nanny of Luna Maximoff.
 Maxwell Caton - Maria Stark Foundation chief accountant.
 Michael Costello - A lawyer.
 Michael O’Brien - A security chief. 
 Mikhail "Mike" Armstrong - Member of the Teen Brigade. 
 Paul Edmonds - A psychiatrist. 
 Paul Withers - A construction manager.
 Peggy Carter - A communications chief and aunt of Sharon Carter.
 Percy Stevens - A construction worker.
 Ramon Trigo - Avengers Compound groundskeeper.
 Raymond Sikorski - National Security Council liaison.
 Roberto Carlos - Avengers Compound butler.
 Roberto Gonzago - Avengers Compound gardener.
 Rosalita "Lita" Torres - Avengers Compound maid.
 Roy Sanford - A physician.
 Talia Kruma - A physicist.
 Theodore "Ted" Sinclair - Teen Brigade member.
 Timothy "Wheels" Wakelin - Member of the Teen Brigade.
 Thomas "Tom" Smith - Teen Brigade member. He turned bitter and tried to kill Rick Jones.
 William "Bill" Bishop - Teen Brigade member. 
 William "Willie" Maximillian - Teen Brigade member. 
 Yolanda Russo - Avengers Compound groundskeeper. 
 Zachary Moonhunter - A pilot.

Reception

Accolades 

 In 2019, CBR.com ranked the Avengers Mansion 3rd in their "10 Most Iconic Superhero Hideouts In Marvel Comics" list.
 In 2020, CBR.com ranked the Avengers Mansion 1st in their "Avengers 10 Best Headquarters" list.
 In 2022, CBR.com ranked the Avengers Mansion 3rd in their "9 Coolest Training Facilities In Marvel Comics" list.

Infinite Avengers Mansion

The Infinite Avengers Mansion was created by Hank Pym in the pocket dimension where Thor sent Janet Van Dyne's body at the end of Secret Invasion. It was the headquarters of Hank Pym's Mighty Avengers and was home to the Avengers Academy.

In other media

Television
 The Avengers Mansion appears in The Avengers: United They Stand. Additionally, Raymond Sikorski (voiced by Ray Landry) also appeared as a government liaison. 
 The Avengers Mansion appears in The Avengers: Earth's Mightiest Heroes. 
 The Avengers Mansion appears in the Avengers Assemble two-part episode "The Avengers Protocol".

Video games
 The Avengers Mansion appears in Marvel: Avengers Alliance.
 The Avengers Mansion appears in Marvel Nemesis: Rise of the Imperfects.
 The Avengers Mansion appears in Lego Marvel Super Heroes. This version is located in Washington Heights, Manhattan.
 The Avengers Mansion appears in Lego Marvel Super Heroes 2.

See also
 X-Mansion
 Baxter Building
 Stark Tower
 Triskelion (comics)

References

Fictional elements introduced in 1963
Avengers (comics)
Fictional houses
Marvel Comics locations
Fictional buildings and structures originating in comic books
Mansions